Lopaphus is an Asian genus of stick insects in the tribe Necrosciini.  Species have been recorded from India, China and South-East Asia.

Species
The Catalogue of Life and Phasmida Species File list:

 Lopaphus albopunctatus (Chen & He, 2004)
 Lopaphus angusticauda (Chen & Xu, 2008)
 Lopaphus atalantia (Thanasinchayakul, 2006)
 Lopaphus bootanicus (Westwood, 1859)
 Lopaphus borneensis Bragg, 1995
 Lopaphus bougainvillea (Thanasinchayakul, 2006)
 Lopaphus brachypterus (Haan, 1842) - type species (as Phasma brachypterum Haan, W. de, locality: Sumatra)
 Lopaphus buegersi Günther, 1929
 Lopaphus crishna (Westwood, 1859)
 Lopaphus iolas (Westwood, 1859)
 Lopaphus muticus (Redtenbacher, 1908)
 Lopaphus nanoalatus Brock, 1999
 Lopaphus pedestris (Redtenbacher, 1908)
 Lopaphus perakensis (Redtenbacher, 1908)
 Lopaphus porus (Westwood, 1859)
 Lopaphus psidium (Thanasinchayakul, 2006)
 Lopaphus shenglii Ho, 2013
 Lopaphus sinensis (Bi, 1995)
 Lopaphus sphalerus (Redtenbacher, 1908)
 Lopaphus srilankensis Hennemann, 2002
 Lopaphus suwinae Seow-Choen, 2000
 Lopaphus tonkinensis (Redtenbacher, 1908)
 Lopaphus transiens (Redtenbacher, 1908)
 Lopaphus trilineatus (Carl, 1913)
 Lopaphus unidentatus (Chen & He, 1995)
 Lopaphus yunnanensis (Chen & He, 1995)
 Lopaphus zayuensis (Chen & He, 2008)

References

External links
 
 

Phasmatodea genera
Phasmatodea of Asia
Lonchodidae